Sessa Aurunca is a town and comune in the province of Caserta, Campania, southern Italy.

It is situated on the site of ancient Suessa Aurunca, near the river Garigliano. The hill on which Sessa lies is a mass of volcanic tuff.

Toponym
The name Sessa comes from  Colonia Julia Felix Classica Suessa (or in short S.P.Q.S."Suessa"), a city belonging to the ancient Auruncan Pentapolis, which is the historic core of the downtown. It is assumed that the name can be derived from the happy location ("sessio", that is, seat, gentle hill from the mild climate of the local territory).

Physical geography
Sessa Aurunca is the largest municipality in Campania.In 1945 the province of Caserta was reconstituted with a legislative decree signed by Umberto di Savoia, suppressed in 1927 and aggregated to the Province of Naples with the exception of Nolano and the district of Acerra and Sessa Aurunca was re-established to the province of Caserta. For territorial extension Sessa are the second in Campania after Ariano Irpino.

History
This site dates more probably from a time before the wars between the Aurunci and the Romans.

In 337 BC the town was abandoned under the pressure of the Sidicini, in favour of the site of the modern Sessa. The new town kept the old name until 313, when a Latin colony under the name Suessa Aurunca was founded here. It was among the towns that had the right of coinage, and it manufactured carts, baskets and others. Cicero speaks of it as a place of some importance. The triumviri settled some of their veterans here, whence it appears as Colonia Julia Felix Classica Suessa. From inscriptions it appears that Matidia the younger, sister-in-law of Hadrian, had property in the district. It was not on a highroad, but on a branch between the Via Appia at Minturnae and the Via Latina crater mentioned.

Suessa saw its maximum urban expansion in the early Roman imperial age: the town extended over an area almost twice the current and counted several large buildings.

After the fall of the Western Roman Empire, Sessa lost much of its population, and was located on the boundaries between the Duchy of Benevento (later Principality of Capua) and the Duchy of Gaeta. Starting from the 14th century it became a fiefdom (as a semi-independent duchy) of the Marzano family, part of the Kingdom of Naples. In 1466 it returned under direct control of the Neapolitan crown.

Main sights

Ancient era
 Roman Theatre (2nd-1st century BC). Excavated since 2001, it was enlarged by Matidia Minor in the second century AD. It could hold more than 6,500 spectators with a scene of about 40 meters in length and 25 in height. The theater was built on the slope of a hill, facing the Gulf of Gaeta.
 Cryptoporticus (1st century BC)
 Aerarium – Tabularium
 Ronaco Bridge, in brickwork, formed by twenty-one arches

Middle Ages 
 Cathedral, a medieval basilica with a vaulted portico and a nave and two aisles. Begun in 1103, internally it features a mosaic pavement in the Cosmatesque style, a good ambo resting on columns and decorated with mosaics showing traces of Moorish influence, a Paschal candle, and an organ gallery. The portal has sculptures with scenes from the life of Saint Peter and Saint Paul. 
 Catacombs of S. Casto
 Ducal Castle, built in the tenth century by the Lombard gastald of the city. It was enlarged under Frederick II of Hohenstaufen with a new tower, and modified to also serve as residence in the 15th century by the Marzano family. It a has a quadrangular plan with double mullioned windows dating from the 13th century.
 Cloister of St. Dominic
 The Cappucini's Gate

Modern and contemporary ages
 Seat of St. Matthew
 Church of St. Stephen
 Church of Sant'Agostino
 Church of Sant'Anna
 St. John's Church at Villa
 Church of San Giovanni Square
 Church of the Annunziata
 St. Charles Church
 Church of St. Germano
 Boarding school "Agostino Nifo" built in the 14th century and opened in 1418.
Sanctuary of Santa Maria della Libera, in the frazione of Carano.

In some streets are memorial stones with inscriptions in honour of Charles V, surmounted by an old crucifix with a mosaic cross.

Culture
Events in the town include:
 The Holy Week at Sessa Aurunca 
 Great District Tournament, held between the first and second Sunday of September.  
 Carnevale Aurunco

Tourism
Baia Domizia is a small resort town included in the comune of Sessa Aurunca. The village was built since 1964 and is located near the river Garigliano, inside an Italian pine forest and nice volcanic sand beaches. The village offers a superb combination of sea, sand and sightseeing. Baia Domizia gained the status as a main destination of summer tourism on the Litorale Domizio and is one of the best known seaside resorts in Campania Region.

Transportation
Sessa Aurunca is connected by railway to Naples and Rome.

See also
Aurunca

References

External links

 https://www.visitsessa.com/

Cities and towns in Campania